Simone Iocolano (born 17 October 1989) is an Italian professional footballer who plays as an attacking midfielder for  club Juventus Next Gen.

Club career
He made his Serie C debut for Bassano Virtus on 22 August 2010 in a game against SPAL.

On 24 January 2016, after spending seven years at Bassano, he joined Alessandria.

Monza
On 2 October 2018, he was signed by Monza. On 25 January 2019, he joined Virtus Entella on loan.

Lecco
On 23 September 2020, Iocolano moved to Lecco on a permanent basis.

Juventus U23
On 21 January 2022, he signed with Juventus U23. Iocolano debutted for the team two days later in a 2–0 defeat by Pro Vercelli. On 17 February 2022, Iocolano scored his first goal for Juventus U23 in a 4–0 win against Piacenza.

Personal life 
Iocolano and his wife, Francesca, have a daughter named Cecilia, born on 15 June 2020.

Honours 
Monza
 Serie C Group A: 2019–20

References

Notelist

External links
 

1989 births
Living people
Footballers from Turin
Italian footballers
Association football midfielders
Serie B players
Serie C players
A.S.D. Calcio Ivrea players
Bassano Virtus 55 S.T. players
S.C. Vallée d'Aoste players
U.S. Alessandria Calcio 1912 players
S.S.C. Bari players
A.C. Monza players
Virtus Entella players
Calcio Lecco 1912 players
Juventus F.C. players
Juventus Next Gen players